John Becker is a writer based in the Washington, D.C. area. His plays are known primarily for their dark humor. He was awarded first place in a theatre festival held at the Kennedy Center in Washington, D.C for a work entitled Summit Meeting. He was also awarded Individual Artist Grants for both fiction and play writing through the Maryland State Arts Council. His plays have been produced throughout the D.C. and Baltimore corridor, as well as the Emerging Artists Theatre in New York.

Published works
Consider the Ravens (play, 1998)
"Milton" (short story, 1999)
Summit Meeting
The Last Sacred Place (play, 2005)

References

www.msac.org/docs_uploaded/iaa06winners.htm

Year of birth missing (living people)
Living people
American dramatists and playwrights
American short story writers